The Orchid Project is a British charity which works to end to female genital cutting (also known as female genital mutilation). Orchid Project is based in London and primarily works to advocate for increased resources towards ending FGC and raising awareness about how the practice can end. They also have programmes with Tostan in West Africa, Feed the Minds in Kenya and with Senegalese musician and activist Sister Fa.

History 
Julia Lalla-Maharajh founded the Orchid Project after first encountering the issue of FGC in Ethiopia. Julia was volunteering with VSO and learned that 75% of women in Ethiopia have been cut. After talking with local activists, all of whom said to her: "Please go, tell the world that this happens. This violates human rights and we need people to know about it."

Julia returned to the UK keen to begin campaigning against FGC. In 2010, she entered a video competition called the Davos Debates with a video about FGC. This led her to later meet Tostan's founder, Molly Melching. Julia went on to spend time working with Tostan in Senegal and Gambia, before returning to the UK and setting up Orchid Project as a charity dedicated to ending FGC.

Goals 
 Advocate to ensure stakeholders resource and prioritise an end to FGC.
 Communicate the potential for an end to FGC, raising awareness about how, why and where female genital cutting happens. 
 Partner with organisations that deliver a sustainable, proven end to female genital cutting.

Key areas of work

Advocacy
Orchid Project aims to secure attention and resources to be invested in ending female genital cutting by engaging with actors and decision-makers at every level–from grassroots, through to regional, national, and international actors. They argue that significant investment is needed if FGC is to end.

Communications
Orchid Project raises awareness of female genital cutting. The journalist Bidisha has said, "The work of The Orchid Project has been invaluable in showing, with great clarity, the reasons, history and arguments surrounding female genital cutting. For anyone learning about this issue, The Orchid Project is the first and best place to go.".

Programmes

Orchid Project partners with organisations that are working to end FGC through work that involves whole communities in ending the practice through a social norms led approach. Like UNICEF, Orchid Project believes that the best way to achieve this is through human rights-led education. They support this change through partnerships with organisations working at a grassroots level.

Hope that FGC can end 
Orchid Project promotes a message that FGC can end within a generation. They often cite similarities between how footbinding ended and FGC, and how the right conditions can motivate mass change. "As with footbinding, public declarations of abandonment are vital to solidify any commitment to ending FGC. When a group of people stand up and publicly declare that they will no longer practice FGC, they are held accountable by everyone" – Gerry Mackie.

Orchid Project have stated that FGC can end through the idea of "organised diffusion", where change is led by communities, and the process of dialogue between communities leads to social change.

References

2011 establishments in the United Kingdom
Activists against female genital mutilation
Social welfare charities based in the United Kingdom
Female genital mutilation in the United Kingdom
Organizations established in 2011
Foreign charities operating in Ethiopia